Route 111 is a highway in New Brunswick, Canada; running from Route 1 exit 137 in Rothesay to Route 1 exit 198 in Sussex Corner, a distance of 91.7 kilometres.

Route description

From Rothesay, Route 111 runs southeast along a Super two taking the name Airport Arterial Road to the Loch Lomond Road in Saint John, near the Saint John Airport. The route turns east along the Loch Lomond Road, changing its name briefly to St. Martins Road, leaving Saint John city limits, paralleling the Bay of Fundy coast to the village of St. Martins. Route 111 turns north from St. Martins through the communities of Upham, Hillsdale and Hammondvale, and uses the New Line Road to its end at Sussex Corner.

History
Route 111 was first designated in 1965, following the routing of former Route 29. Until the construction of the Saint John Airport connector in 1991, Route 111 continued along the Loch Lomond Road into Saint John's city centre, and it has also been extended in Sussex Corner to reach the former Trans-Canada Highway, now part of Route 1.

Major intersections

References

111
Roads in Kings County, New Brunswick
111
Transport in Saint John, New Brunswick